Erna Brodber (born 20 April 1940) is a Jamaican writer, sociologist and social activist. She is the sister of writer Velma Pollard.

Biography
Born in the farming village of Woodside, Saint Mary Parish, Jamaica, she gained a B.A. from the University College of the West Indies, followed by an MSc and PhD, and has received a predoctoral fellowship in psychiatric anthropology. She subsequently worked as a civil servant, teacher, sociology lecturer, and researcher at the Institute for Social and Economic Research in the University of the West Indies (UWI), Mona, Jamaica. During Brodber's time working at the Institute for Social and Economic Research at the University of the West Indies, she collected several oral histories of elderly people's lives in rural Jamaica, which inspired her novel, Louisiana.
After working at the university, she left to work full-time in her home community of Woodside.

She is the author of five novels: Jane and Louisa Will Soon Come Home (1980), Myal (1988), Louisiana (1994), The Rainmaker's Mistake (2007), and Nothing's Mat (2014). Brodber works as a freelance writer, researcher and lecturer in Jamaica. She has received many awards, including the Gold Musgrave medal three times: once from the Institute of Jamaica for work in literature, once from the government of Jamaica for community work, and once from the government of the Netherlands for work in literature and orature Brodber is currently Writer in Residence at the University of the West Indies.

Work 
Brodber--trained as a sociologist with a Ph.D. and several publications on Jamaican society--emphasizes non-western forms of understanding in her fiction, deconstructing the historical methodologies of colonialist knowledge. She works to challenge western ways of ordering the world, and to resurrect myth and tradition as a form of historical rehabilitation from the psychic damage of slavery and colonialism. She weaves fantastical, non-realist elements with traditional modes of story-telling--emphasizing both as crucial to the psychic make-up of her characters and the world around them.

Awards and honours
She won the Caribbean and Canadian regional Commonwealth Writers' Prize in 1989 for Myal. In 1999 she received the Jamaican Musgrave Gold Award for Literature and Orature. She received a Windham–Campbell Literature Prize in 2017.

Bibliography

Novels
 Jane and Louisa Will Soon Come Home (New Beacon Books, 1980)
 Myal: A Novel (New Beacon Books, 1988), 
 Louisiana (New Beacon Books, 1994)
 The Rainmaker's Mistake (New Beacon Books, 2007), 
 Nothing's Mat (University of West Indies Press, 2014), 

Non-fiction
 The People of my Jamaican Village, 1817 - 1948 (Blackspace, 1999), 
 Woodside, Pear Tree Grove P.O. (University of the West Indies Press, 2004), 
 The Second Generation of Freemen in Jamaica, 1907–1944 (University Press of Florida, 2004), 
 The Continent of Black Consciousness: On the History of the African Diaspora from Slavery to the Present Day (New Beacon Books, 2003), 
 Moments of Cooperation and Incorporation: African American and African Jamaican Connections, 1782-1996 (The University of West Indies Press, 2019), 

Play

 Ratoon: a New Jamaica (2015). Performed by the Edna Manley College of the Visual and Performing Arts, School of Drama, directed by Carolyn Allen.

References

External links
 
  
  
  Review of Erna Brodber's Jane and Louisa Will Soon Come Home
 
 "Traditional Folklore and the Question of History in Erna Brodber's Louisiana" by Jérémie Kroubo Dagnini for the Journal of Pan African Studies On-Line, December 2011.
 Mel Cooke, "Erna Brodber presents her freedom song", Jamaica Gleaner, 18 May 2007.
 Keshia Abraham, Interview with Erna Brodber, BOMB 86/Winter 2004.
 Nadia Ellis Russell, "Crossing borders - An interview with writer, scholar, and activist Erna Brodber" , Woodside, Jamaica, 7 May 2001.

1940 births
Living people
Recipients of the Musgrave Medal
20th-century Jamaican women writers
20th-century Jamaican novelists
Jamaican women novelists
Women sociologists
Jamaican women activists
People from Saint Mary Parish, Jamaica